Turtle weed may refer to:

Batis maritima, a vascular plant species
Chlorodesmis, a genus of algae